Delitschia is a genus of fungi in the family Delitschiaceae.

The genus name of Delitschia is in honour of Otto Delitsch (1821 - 1882), a German theologist and Professor of Geography at the Leipzig University.

The genus was circumscribed by Bernhard Auerswald in Hedwigia Vol.5 (Issue 4) on page 49 in 1866.

References

External links
Index Fungorum

Pleosporales